ALS (Amyotrophic Lateral Sclerosis) is a chronic and fatal form of motor neuron disease; also known as Lou Gehrig's disease.

ALS or Als may also refer to:

Places
 Als (island), Denmark

Aviation
 Airman Leadership School, a U.S. Air Force program
 ALS – Aircraft Leasing Services, a Kenyan airline
 Approach lighting system, an airport runway lighting system
 San Luis Valley Regional Airport, IATA code ALS

Medicine
 Advanced life support, a level of medical training
 Amyotrophic lateral sclerosis, or Lou Gehrig's disease, a neurodegenerative disease.
 Anterolateral system, part of the nervous system
 Antibodies from lymphocyte secretions, an immunological assay
 Angular leaf spot, a bacterial plant disease

Science and technology
 Acetolactate synthase, an enzyme
 Advanced Light Source, a synchrotron radiation facility
 ALSN, automatic train signalling (автоматична локомотивна сигналізація), a train protection system
 Alternate line service, a mobile phone feature
 Aluminized steel, as used in engineering drawings
 Ammonium lauryl sulfate, a household chemical
 Antilag system, a system used on turbocharged engines
 Audio Lossless Coding, an audio codec
 LS TTL, advanced low-power Schottky
 Photodetector, ambient light sensor
 Alternating least squares, a matrix factorization method

Organizations
 Als, a nickname used for the Montreal Alouettes of the Canadian Football League
 ALS Association, an American nonprofit organization
 Arrowhead Library System (Wisconsin)
 Australian Linguistic Society
 Associated London Scripts, a comedy-writers collective founded by Spike Milligan

Other uses
 A. Lange & Söhne, a German luxury watch brand
 als, since 2003 prefix for the Wikipedia (:als:Wikipedia:Houptsyte) of Alemannic German dialects like Alsatian, Swabian, Swiss German
 als, since 2007 the ISO 639-3 code for the southern Albanian dialect (Tosk Albanian)
 Alternative Learning System (Philippines), a modular non-formal education program
 Associate of the Linnean Society of London
 Auld Lang Syne, a traditional Scottish folk song
 Autographed Letter Signed, a term used by autograph collectors
 Singapore Area Licensing Scheme